The Al-Fanar Hotel (Arabic, فندق الفنار) is a hotel in Baghdad, Iraq. It is popular with independent travelers to the city. It is also the place where the Iraqi Heavy Metal band Acrassicauda played their last concert inside Iraq. 

References

Hotels in Iraq
Buildings and structures in Baghdad